The Agusan Marsh Wildlife Sanctuary is a protected area in Agusan del Sur, Philippines declared by President Fidel V. Ramos. The marshland acts like a sponge, as it is nestled in the midwaters of the Agusan River drainage basin. Within its lakes, several floating communities can be found. The sanctuary was home to the  saltwater crocodile Lolong, the world's largest captive crocodile.

It is located in the municipalities of Bunawan, La Paz, Loreto, Rosario, San Francisco, Talacogon, and Veruela in the province of Agusan del Sur. The marsh was declared as a Ramsar Wetland Site in 1999. The site is currently being re-evaluated for nomination to the tentative list of UNESCO.

Description
Agusan Marsh is one of the most ecologically significant wetlands in the Philippines. Found in the heart of Mindanao's Agusan Basin, this vast expanse of marsh covers an area roughly the size of Metro Manila. It contains nearly 15% of the nation's fresh water resources in the form of swamp forests.

During the rainy season, when the water rises to create large lakes, vast number of ducks come to Agusan Marsh to nest. In the dry months, thousands of birds come from as faraway as Japan, China and Russia to escape the chilly winter winds of Northern Asia. Over 200 individual species have been known to spend at least part of the year in the marsh, making it one of Asia's most important transit points for wild birds.

In the very heart of the marsh is a semi-permanent lake where many square kilometres of lily pads, hyacinths and other hydrophytic plants spread out like an enormous green quilt. In the dark tea-colored waters live untold numbers of catfish, carp, soft-shell fresh water turtles, and crocodiles.

Agusan Marsh is also host to "Wonderland", where you can see natural "bonsai" trees crafted by nature. It can be reached from Barangay Caimpogan or from Barangay New Visayas in the municipality of San Francisco.

The tiny community of mostly ethnic Manobos have made their permanent homes deep within the marsh, living on floating homes. The small houses made of bamboo and nipa lashed to hardwood logs, freely rise or fall with the level of the marsh itself. The marsh provides virtually everything the Manobos need.

See also
 List of protected areas in the Philippines

References

External links
 Agusan Marsh Wildlife Sanctuary – World Heritage Centre
 "The Annotated Ramsar List: Philippines"

Marshes of the Philippines
Wildlife sanctuaries of the Philippines
Ramsar sites in the Philippines
Landforms of Agusan del Sur
Protected areas established in 1996
1996 establishments in the Philippines